Cardinal and Hoosier State refers to two Amtrak train routes:

 Cardinal (train)
 Hoosier State (train)